Tush Manlu (also Romanized as Tūsh Mānlū and Tūshmānlū) is a village in Garmeh-ye Shomali Rural District, Kandovan District, Meyaneh County, East Azerbaijan Province, Iran. At the 2006 census, its population was 673, in 119 families.

Tushmanlu offstream reservoir gravity dam

Introduction 

Tushmanlu is famous for its apple. Most of the farmers in Tushmanlu produce high quality apples. 

Old Tushmanlu offstream reservoir gravity dam was constructed 
around the village of Tushmanlu in northern part of Mianeh, 
East Azerbaijan early after Islamic revolution of Iran in 
1357 Iranian year. Regarding the high quality of soil and 
water and proper weather condition, the best quality of 
gardens crops has persuaded farmers to develop the area 
of their gardens. On the other hand because of the poor 
design and construction of the traditional existing dam, 
studies of building a higher and more stable dam instead 
of old dam started by Pars Ray Ab Consulting Engineering  Company in 1379 Iranian year.

Department 
 
Water Resources Development and Dam Construction 
General Specifications of Dam:
Water transmission system: Water transmission canal with 
length of 6 km and capacity of 1 cms
Type of dam: Earthfill dam with impervious clay core
Foundation seepage control system: Plastic concrete cutoff wall 
Height of dam: 20 m above riverbed
Spillway: Free flow spillway in right abutment
Area of the gardens covered by dam reservoir: 500 ha

Client 

East Azerbaijan and Ardebil Regional Water company - 
East Azerbaijan Water Affairs Administration.

Project Progress 

Studies of project started in 1379 and completed in 1381. 
Construction works of project achieved during 1381 to 1384 
and the project has been under operation since the spring of 1384.

References 

Populated places in Meyaneh County